Perry County Courthouse is a historic courthouse building located at Linden in Perry County, Tennessee, United States. It was built in 1928, having replaced an earlier courthouse that was destroyed by fire.

History
The first courthouse in Linden was a log cabin, built circa 1845, after Decatur County was split off from Perry County and Linden became the county seat. That log courthouse was replaced in 1849-50 by a new two-story wood-frame building. The second courthouse was burned down by Union Army soldiers on May 12, 1863.

The Perry County Courthouse was listed on the National Register of Historic Places in 1995.

References

External links
Perry County Chamber of Commerce
Images for Perry County, Tennessee, CourthouseHistory.com

County courthouses in Tennessee
Government buildings completed in 1928
Courthouses on the National Register of Historic Places in Tennessee
Buildings and structures in Perry County, Tennessee
1928 establishments in Tennessee
National Register of Historic Places in Perry County, Tennessee